This is a list of comic collection books in the Big Nate franchise, an American comic strip written and illustrated by Lincoln Peirce.

Collections

References 

Big Nate
Comics